Miles Fire was a wildfire in the Rogue River National Forest in Oregon, United States. As of August 29, 2018 the fire had burned  and was 55% contained.

References 

2018 Oregon wildfires
2018 in Oregon